Jared Lewis (born 9 March 1982) is a sprinter from Saint Vincent and the Grenadines who specializes in the 100 metres. He was born in Kingstown. His personal best time is 10.49 seconds, achieved in April 2005 in Vincennes.

He competed at the 2008 World Indoor Championships and the 2008 Olympic Games without progressing to the second round. In Beijing he placed 7th in his heat in a time of 11.00 seconds.

References

1982 births
Living people
Saint Vincent and the Grenadines male sprinters
Athletes (track and field) at the 2008 Summer Olympics
Olympic athletes of Saint Vincent and the Grenadines
People from Kingstown